Émile Arbogast (23 March 1901 – 12 February 1978) was a French breaststroke swimmer. He competed in two events at the 1920 Summer Olympics.

References

External links
 

1901 births
1978 deaths
French male breaststroke swimmers
Olympic swimmers of France
Swimmers at the 1920 Summer Olympics
Sportspeople from Bas-Rhin
People from Alsace-Lorraine
20th-century French people